Schloss Einstein is a long-running, popular German television series which is designed as a teenage soap opera. It portrays the lives of teenagers in Schloss Einstein (Castle Einstein), a fictional boarding school. The intended audience is 10- to 14-year-olds.

The series combines the genres of comedy, action, drama (e.g., first love, problems with parents and schoolmates), and natural science. Scripts for the series are written by prominent television script writers.

Current air times 
New episodes of Schloss Einstein are currently shown on Saturdays at 2:35 p.m. on channel KiKa. Older episodes are shown regularly from Monday to Friday at 2:10 p.m. on KiKa.

History 

Starting in September 2007,  took over production of the series.

Because the show has its own genre as a Kinder-Weekly (children's weekly), the producers had had no experience with this kind of series. Originally, only 76 episodes were planned. ARD went to yearly sequels after they knew it was a success. Since then, each season of production has consisted of 52 episodes, which are shot in 13 blocks of four episodes each.

The first episode was aired September 4, 1998, on channel KiKa. Prior to the show's eleventh season (which began in January 2008), a total of 480 episodes had been produced. Episode 480 was the last episode that was set in the fictional village of Seelitz.

Up to March 2016, a total of 870 episodes in 19 seasons had aired. This was a milestone in German television programming. Worldwide, Schloss Einstein is the longest-running fictional children's television series (among those that employ child actors).

Concept 
Schloss Einstein is a television show intended for an audience of children. The show guides its viewers through the entire school year and offers characters with whom children can identify. Because the actors are the same age as their viewers, their actions look authentic.

In its representation of classroom lessons, real knowledge is taught. Thus the show provides both entertainment and instruction. It provides education in a relaxed way. Because it has implemented this concept, Schloss Einstein is unique worldwide and has been made the object of several scientific studies.

Storyline 
Dr. Stollberg realizes a dream. He establishes a private school in an old castle and names his school “the Albert-Einstein-Gymnasium, Internat Schloss Seelitz.” The school bears the name of the founder of the theory of relativity because it teaches natural science. Its students shorten the long name, and it is thereafter known as “Schloss Einstein.”

Dr. Stollberg wants to provide an education for his students by using his best strength — personal tutoring. Violence is forbidden in the school. Problems that arise must be solved peacefully and, if possible, by the children themselves. Newcomers are given an older student who acts as a “godparent.” Of course, this does not always go smoothly, but the teachers and students must master their everyday life under a common roof.

At the center of the show are the personal responsibilities of teenagers from class 6 to class 8. Because there are no parents present, the children must make decisions for themselves and be prepared for the consequences. A few adults appear as advisers or counselors.

The students experience problems such as grades, cliques, envy, friendships, puberty, first love, career hopes, alcoholism, and the divorce or unemployment of their parents.

In many episodes, the students have adventures and learn how to manage conflicts. They also have fun with all kinds of jokes and pranks. There is tension between the Schloss Einstein students and the students who attend public schools. They do not like each other but have to get along. Compromise and tolerance are important in these relationships.

In the later episodes, which are set in the city of Erfurt, no public school students are present. However, students who attend other private schools are present from time to time.

Setting and Cast 

The first ten seasons were set in the fictional village of Seelitz, near Berlin. With the advent of the eleventh season on January  5, 2008, (episode 481) the setting was transferred to the real city of Erfurt.

In Seelitz 
Schloss Einstein was shot from 1998 to 2007 (episodes 1–480) on the grounds of the Babelsberg Studios in Potsdam. The Jagdschloss Grunewald in Berlin served as backdrop. Outdoor filming was done in the Klein Glienicke quarter of Potsdam and in surrounding villages.

Main Cast 
 Students

 Teachers and Staff

 Village Youth

In Erfurt 
Since September 2007, Schloss Einstein is produced by Saxonia Media Filmproduktion and filmed at the Kindermedienzentrum Erfurt.

The school has two different buildings: the school building and the dormitory building. The Kindermedienzentrum Erfurt contains all the sets for the school.

The set for the school building has classrooms, a cafeteria, hallways, stairs, and a gymnasium. It also contains all the sets used for the dormitory building.

Main Cast 
 Students

 Teachers and Staff

Awards and success 
The show has received three awards.

In March 1999, a jury of 32 children awarded it the Goldener Spatz (Golden Sparrow) in the category Fiktion kurz (short fiction). This was at the eleventh Deutsches Kinder-Film und Fernseh-Festivals (German Children's Film and Television Festival).
In July 1999, Schloss Einstein won the Goldener Telix from the TV guide Gong in the category Serie oder Film mit Schauspielern (television series or film with actors).
In 2010, it won the Goldener Spatz award again in the series category.

The popular success of the show has resulted in high TV ratings. Schloss Einstein is shown not only in Germany but also in many other countries: in Norway, Russia, Belarus, Ukraine, Slovakia, Hungary, Italy, Liechtenstein, Belgium, and the Netherlands. A textbook for use in German schools, containing themes from Schloss Einstein, has been published.

Opening credits 
From the first season to the end of the eighth season, there were always new, but similar, opening credits.

In all opening credits, some current actors who play the students are shown with their respective character names. In the background, the viewers can hear the song “Die Einsteins feat. Julian  — Alles ist relativ.”

All opening credits until the end of the fourth season had a duration of 47 seconds. As of the fifth season, the opening credits and background music were prolonged by seven seconds to a total length of 54 seconds. This was done so that a few more actors could be presented.

The ninth season featured a completely redesigned opening credits sequence, which lasts 54 seconds. The 19 main characters from classes 6 to 9 are presented on-screen in 13 short scenes, which show several characters at once. Teachers, other adults, and children who are not students at Schloss Einstein are omitted.

Current opening credits 

Starting with the tenth season, completely new opening credits were again developed. The background music was slightly modified, and the duration of the credits was lengthened. All main characters are presented along with their character names.

Seasons of production

Events 
At irregular intervals, events featuring the actors of Schloss Einstein take place in Germany.

Among these events were:
the Gi’me-5-KiKa-Party (day for friendship and tolerance, August 31, 2003)
the international children's party (23 Nisan) in Berlin (April 24, 2004)
the KiKa-Party for the 300th episode of Schloss Einstein (June 7, 2004)
the Schloss-Einstein-Sommerparty (Schloss Einstein summer party, June 27, 2005)
the KiKa summer tours, which take place annually

On June 10, 2007, there was a ceremony in Potsdam-Babelsberg on the occasion of the last shooting day.

Books 
In 2000, the book Schloss Einstein — Das Klassenbuch: 100 Folgen Schloss Einstein (Schloss Einstein — The Classbook: 100 Episodes of Schloss Einstein) was published. It presents the main actors in the show and the contents previous episodes. It was published by vgs verlagsgesellschaft. A poster book and an autograph book have also been published.

In 2003, a cookbook Schloss Einstein — Kochen mit Einstein (Cooking with Schloss Einstein) was published. It was written by Peter Brandt and Dieter Saldecki, and published by vgs verlagsgesellschaft.

Sixteen novels about Schloss Einstein have been published.

Volumes 1 to 5 were written by Simon Hauser
Volumes 6 to 11 and 15 were written by Uschi Flacke
Volumes 12 to 14 and 16 were written by Dana Bechtle-Bechtinger

The titles of the novels are:

Besides the novels, there are three Schloss Einstein Exklusiv books in which the further histories of the main actors of the first season are told. These were written by Uschi Flacke and published by vgs verlagsgesellschaft. They are:

 Katharina — Modelträume werden wahr
 Kleine Prinzen
 Nadines Story

Other media 
In 2004, a music album was published, which included many bands.

A "Best of" DVD, several radio dramas on cassettes and CDs, and a magazine about the show covering the years 2001 to 2003, have also been released.

References

External links

 Official website of the production company ASKANIA MEDIA Filmproduktion GmbH (includes press reports for the television program) 
 Official website of the production company Saxonia Media Filmproduktion GmbH 
 

German children's television series
1998 German television series debuts
2000s German television series
2010s German television series
2020s German television series
German-language television shows
High school television series
Television series about teenagers
Teen drama television series
German educational television series
Fictional schools
Westdeutscher Rundfunk
Mitteldeutscher Rundfunk